The 2009 Barcelona Ladies Open was a women's tennis tournament played on outdoor clay courts. It was the 3rd edition of the Barcelona Ladies Open, and it was an International-level tournament on the 2009 WTA Tour. It took place at the David Lloyd Club Turó in Barcelona, Catalonia, Spain, from 13 April until 19 April 2009. Unseeded Roberta Vinci won the singles title.

Finals

Singles 

 Roberta Vinci defeated  Maria Kirilenko, 6–0, 6–4
 It was Vinci's first title of the year and second of her career.

Doubles 

 Nuria Llagostera Vives /  María José Martínez Sánchez defeated  Sorana Cîrstea /  Andreja Klepač, 3–6, 6–2, 10–8

External links 
 Official website
 Singles, Doubles and Qualifying Singles Draws

  
Barcelona Ladies Open
Barcelona Ladies Open
2009 in Catalan sport
Barcelona